Italy competed at the 2019 Winter Deaflympics held between 12 and 21 December 2019 in Sondrio Province in Northern Italy. Alpine skier Giacomo Pierbon won gold medals in all five men's alpine skiing events which meant that the country finished in 2nd place in the medal table with a total of five gold medals and two bronze medals.

Medalists

Alpine skiing 

Giacomo Pierbon won the gold medal in the men's downhill event. He also won the gold medal in the men's alpine combined event.

He went on to win the gold medals in all other men's alpine skiing event as well: the men's Super-G event, the men's giant slalom event and the men's slalom event.

Chess 

Duilio Collutiis won the bronze medal in the men's blitz tournament.

Curling 

Italy competed in the men's tournament.

Snowboarding 

Erica Dugnani won the bronze medal in the women's snowboard cross event.

References 

Winter Deaflympics
Nations at the 2019 Winter Deaflympics